Daniel Joseph Hone (born 15 September 1989) is an English former professional footballer.

Hone played as a defender notably in the Football League for Lincoln City. He also played for Darlington, Barrow, Gainsborough Trinity, North Ferriby United and FC Halifax Town.

Career
Hone is a product of the Lincoln City centre of excellence and made his debut in the FA Cup first round match against Nottingham Forest which ended as a 1–1 draw filling in for the injured Lee Beevers and the ineligible Hamza Bencherif. He signed a -year professional contract for Lincoln in December 2007. He scored his first Lincoln City goal in a 2–1 home victory over Rochdale in February 2008.

In May 2011 he was one of just three squad players to be offered a new contract after a mass clear out of players following relegation from the Football League, and he duly signed up for a further year on 30 June 2011. Although he played ten games early in the season for Lincoln, he lost his place in the team and was loaned to Barrow in November 2011.

In May 2012, manager David Holdsworth confirmed that Hone would not be offered a new contract. In July 2012 he joined Gainsborough Trinity on trial, and a week later signed a one-year contract. In May 2013 he signed for North Ferriby United.

Hone then signed for FC Halifax Town in 2016, but departed after a season.

Personal life
He is the son of former Lincoln City defender, Mark Hone; they are the fifth father and son to represent the club.

Hone now owns and runs an indoor football facility.

Honours
North Ferriby United
FA Trophy: 2014–15

References

External links

Lincoln City profile

1989 births
Living people
Footballers from Croydon
English footballers
Association football defenders
Lincoln City F.C. players
Darlington F.C. players
Barrow A.F.C. players
Gainsborough Trinity F.C. players
North Ferriby United A.F.C. players
FC Halifax Town players
English Football League players
National League (English football) players